Jochen Thomas Hecht (born 21 June 1977) is a German ice hockey coach and a former professional ice hockey player. He has been serving as assistant coach for Adler Mannheim since March 2022.

Hecht played 833 games in the National Hockey League (NHL) for the St. Louis Blues, Edmonton Oilers and Buffalo Sabres and also began and finished his career with Adler Mannheim of the Deutsche Eishockey Liga (DEL).

Playing career
As a youth, Hecht played in the 1990 and 1991 Quebec International Pee-Wee Hockey Tournaments with a team from Baden-Württemberg.

The St. Louis Blues selected Hecht in the second round, 49th overall, of the 1995 NHL Entry Draft from Adler Mannheim of the Deutsche Eishockey Liga (DEL). Hecht played two full seasons for the Blues, compiling 32 goals and 46 assists before being dealt, along with Marty Reasoner and Jan Horáček, to the Edmonton Oilers for Doug Weight and Michel Riesen on 1 July 2001.

After appearing in a full season with the Oilers, Hecht was traded to the Buffalo Sabres in exchange for the 31st and 36th picks in the 2002 NHL Entry Draft. As a Sabre, Hecht had his most successful NHL season, in terms of points scored, in 2006–07 with 56 points (19 goals, 37 assists).

Hecht was chosen as the captain for the month of October 2007 and later during February 2008. He is the second German-born player to captain an NHL team – Walt Tkaczuk was the first. The C was rotated monthly during the 2007–08 season. On 16 October 2007, Hecht agreed to a four-year, $14.1 million contract extension, which kept him in Buffalo until the 2011–12 season. Hecht scored his 300th career point on 26 October 2007, when he scored against Florida Panthers' goaltender Tomáš Vokoun.

Hecht returned to the city of Mannheim with the Sabres to play against Adler in an exhibition game on 4 October 2011. Hecht, who was recovering from an injury and did not play, received a standing ovation upon skating onto the ice in pre-game practice.

After being injured in January 2012 with a concussion, Hecht missed the remainder of the season and ended the year as a free agent. Several months into the 2012–13 NHL lockout, and after consulting with German doctors (who determined that some of his symptoms were neck-related), he rejoined Adler, joining Sabres linemate Jason Pominville, who joined Adler as a lockout player. After the lockout ended, he re-signed with the Sabres to a one-year, $1 million deal.

On 26 April 2013, Hecht announced his retirement from the NHL to reporters in the locker room following the Sabres' final regular season game against the New York Islanders.

Following his retirement from the NHL, Hecht announced his intention to return to Mannheim to finish out his career. In 2015, he won his third German championship with the Adler squad. The first two titles came before his NHL career, in 1997 and 1998. Hecht played a total of three additional years in Germany before retiring from professional hockey in 2016.

International play
Hecht appeared in four games with Team Germany at the 2002 Winter Olympics in Salt Lake City, Utah. He scored a goal and an assist as Germany finished eighth. He had been named to the team for the 2006 Winter Olympics in Turin, Italy. He was injured, however, in his last NHL game before the Olympic break and was unable to play. He played in four World Junior Ice Hockey Championships for Team Germany between 1994 and 1997, and shares the record for most games played in World Junior Ice Hockey Championships together with Switzerland's Björn Christen.

Coaching career 
Hecht was named player development coach for Adler Mannheim on August 2, 2016. He served as assistant to Marco Sturm, head coach of the German men's national team, during the 2016 Deutschland-Cup. In July 2017, Hecht was promoted to the assistant coach position at Adler Mannheim and parted company with the club in May 2018 to take care of getting his coaching licenses. Hecht also worked for German TV as ice hockey pundit, on March 29, 2022, he returned to Adler Mannheim as assistant coach.

Career statistics

Regular season and playoffs

International

References

External links

 

1977 births
Adler Mannheim players
Buffalo Sabres captains
Buffalo Sabres players
Edmonton Oilers players
German ice hockey coaches
German ice hockey left wingers
Ice hockey players at the 1998 Winter Olympics
Ice hockey players at the 2002 Winter Olympics
Ice hockey players at the 2010 Winter Olympics
Living people
Olympic ice hockey players of Germany
Sportspeople from Mannheim
St. Louis Blues draft picks
St. Louis Blues players
Worcester IceCats players